The Pletschuhorn is a mountain of the Swiss Pennine Alps, overlooking the Turtmanntal in the canton of Valais. It is composed of several summits, of which the highest has an elevation of 2,751 metres.

The closest locality is Gruben, on the east side of the mountain.

References

External links
 Pletschuhorn on Hikr

Mountains of the Alps
Mountains of Switzerland
Mountains of Valais
Two-thousanders of Switzerland